Phyllis Matthewman (née Barton) (19 January 1896 – 1979), British writer of children's books, mostly boarding school stories, and adult fiction.

Personal life
Matthewman was born in Leeds, the elder daughter of Thomas Barton, an insurance manager, and Ada Mary (née Pollard). She had a sister, Joyce. In 1930, she married Sydney Matthewman, a literary agent, whose father ran the Swan Press in Leeds. They had no children. In 1964, her long-time friend Elinor Brent-Dyer was persuaded to leave the unmanageably large Victorian villa at which she had previously run a school in order to live with the Matthewmans, which she did until her death in 1969. After first living together as tenants in half of a house called Albury Edge, at Redhill, Surrey, they bought a house together, Gryphons, also at Redhill, in 1965. Phyllis's aunt, who knew the Dyer family, had introduced them in childhood. Sydney Matthewman served as Brent-Dyer's agent.

Selected books

Daneswood series
 Chloe Takes Control, 1940
 The Queerness of Rusty, 1941
 Josie Moves Up, 1943
 A New Role for Natasha, 1945
 Justice for Jacqueline, 1946
 Pat at the Helm, 1947
 The Intrusion of Nicola, 1948

Kirkdale Priory series
 Because of Vivian, 1947
 The Turbulence of Tony, 1951
 The Coming of Lys, 1951
 The Amateur Prefects, 1951

The 'Mr. Jones' books
 Thanks to Mr. Jones, 1948
 Peter-New Girl, 1948
 Mr. Jones Tips the Scales, 1950
 Peter Plays the Sleuth, 1950

Other children's books
 Jill on the Land (1942)
 John Williams, biography of John Williams (missionary), (1954, Oliphants)
 The Mystery of Snake Island (1962, University of London Press)
 No Magic Carpet (1966, EJ Arnold)

Adult romance fiction
 Set to Partners (1944, Mills & Boon)
 Utility Wedding (1946, Mills & Boon)
 Stable Companions (1947, Mills & Boon)
 How Could You, Jennifer! (1948, Mills & Boon)
 River of Enchantment (1948, Mills & Boon)
 Colour of Romance (1949, Mills & Boon)
 The Veil Between (1950, Mills & Boon)
 The Imprudence of Prue (1951, Mills & Boon)
 Winged Cupid, (1951, Mills & Boon)
 Clutch of Circumstance (1952, Mills & Boon)
 Imitation Marriage (1952, Mills & Boon)
 Castle to Let (1953, Mills & Boon)
 Welcome Enemy (1953, Mills & Boon)
 Luck for Lindy (1954, Mills & Boon)
 Sir, she Said (1954, Mills & Boon)
 The Beckoning House (1955, Mills & Boon)
 Beginners, Please (1955, Mills & Boon)
 Fetters of a Dream (1956, Mills & Boon)
 Romance Goes Tenting (1956, Mills & Boon)
 Safari with Wings (1957, Mills & Boon)
 Cupid in Mayfair (1958, Mills & Boon)
 Wife on Approval (1958, Mills & Boon)
 Food of Love (1959, Mills & Boon)
 Ace of Hearts (1960, Mills & Boon)
 Call Me Cousin (1960, Mills & Boon)
 Cupid Under Capricorn (1961, Mills & Boon)
 Maiden's Castle (1962, Mills & Boon)
 Voyage into Happiness (1962, Mills & Boon)
 Ward of Court (1963, Mills & Boon)
 A Brother for Jane (1964, Mills & Boon)
 Make Up Your Mind, Nurse (1964, Mills & Boon)
 The Wonderful Year (1964, Mills & Boon)
 Bolt of Cupid, (1965, Mills & Boon)
 The Heart is Highland (1965, Mills & Boon)
 Tread Warily (1966, Mills & Boon)
 The Magic of the Moon (1967, Mills & Boon)

Adult thrillers
 Brides of the Devil (1946), published under the name Jacqueline Yorke

References

External links
 http://www.fantasticfiction.co.uk/m/phyllis-matthewman/
 http://www.gatewaymonthly.com/girlauthorb.html

British children's writers
Women romantic fiction writers
20th-century British women writers
1979 deaths
1896 births
People from Leeds